Bhedetar (translation: Sheep's Butte) is a village development committee in Dhankuta District in the Koshi Zone of eastern Nepal. The main settlement began when the Dharan - Dhankuta Highway was completed in 1982.  At the time of the 1991 Nepal census it had a population of 2643 people living in 513 individual households. It is 1,420 meters high from the sea level. It is actually on the border line of Sunsari and Dhankuta districts.

Attractions 
Bhedetar is a developing tourist spot. It is a small hill station just 16 kilometers away from Dharan Sub-metropolis. It has unpredictable weather - one moment it hides itself in the blanket of thick fog and another moment it reveals itself as the crown of urban Dharan. it is also known as a transit point to the namaste jharna, which is a waterfall.

Nepal Television has a High Power Transmitter Station at Bhedetar which broadcasts different Channels of Nepal Television. Transmissions are not only received by the Bhedetar but also neighbouring places.

References

Populated places in Dhankuta District